Millspaugh is a surname. Notable people with the surname include:

Arthur Millspaugh (1883-1955), adviser at the U.S. State Department's Office of the Foreign Trade
Charles Frederick Millspaugh (1854-1923), American botanist
Frank C. Millspaugh (1872-1947), U.S. Representative from Missouri

See also
Millspaugh, California, unincorporated community in Inyo County, California